Crimean Tatar is written in both Latin and Cyrillic. Historically, the Arabic script was also used.

Since 1990s when Verkhovna Rada of Crimea officially accepted the new Turkish-based Latin alphabet it had been dominant mostly on the internet while the Soviet Cyrillic alphabet remained dominant in printed productions. After 2014 Russian annexation of Crimea Russian government requires the use of Cyrillic script only. In 2021 Ukrainian government started the switch of Crimean Tatar language to the Latin script.

History

Arabic script 

Crimean Tatars used the Arabic script from the 16th century to 1928, when it was replaced by the Latin alphabet based on Yañalif. The Crimean variant contained a couple of modified Arabic letters.

1 — The letter ﻙ (kef) was often used in place of ﮒ and ﯓ.

Latin alphabet 

In 1928, during latinisation in the Soviet Union, the Crimean Tatar Arabic alphabet was replaced by the Latin alphabet based on the Yañalif script. This alphabet contained a number of differences from the modern variant. Particularly, the letters Ь ь, Ƣ ƣ, Ꞑ ꞑ, Ɵ ɵ, X x, Ƶ ƶ, I i instead of the modern Â â, Ğ ğ, I ı, İ i, Ñ ñ, Ö ö, and Ü ü.

Modern alphabets

Cyrillic 

Cyrillic for Crimean Tatar was introduced in 1938 as part of Cyrillization of languages in Soviet Union. It is based on Russian alphabet with no special letters. From 1938 to 1990s, that was the only alphabet used for Crimean Tatar.

*Гъ (ğ), къ (q), нъ (ñ) and дж (c) are separate letters of the alphabet (digraphs).

Latin 

Modern Latin alphabet for Crimean Tatar was introduced in 1990s. It is based on Turkish alphabet with three special letters — Q, Ñ, Â. Its official use in Crimea was accepted in 1997 by Crimean Parliament. In 2021 it was approved by the government of Ukraine, to be adopted in education by September 2025.

*Ââ is not recognized as separate letter. It is used to show softness of a consonant followed by Aa. 

1. Crimean Tatars in Dobruja also use Ĭĭ and Ww letters. The letter Ĭ ĭ represents [ɪ] and the W w letter represents [w]. Crimean Tatars in Crimea use the letter İ i for two sounds, [ɪ] and [i]. the letter V v also represents two sounds, [w] and [v], but in Dobruja, every letter represents a single sound,  İ i represents [i] and V v represents [v].

 In Crimea İ i represents [i] only when it is behind the letter Y y. In all other positions it is [ı], although in Romania, there is the Ĭ ĭ letter for this sound.

 In Crimea the letter V v represents [v] only in loanwords. In all other words, it represents [w], but in Romania, [w] is represented as W w.

Cyrillic to Latin transliteration

References 

 Кай И.С. Руководство для обучения крымско-татарскому языку по новому алфавиту — Симферополь, 1928.
 Alem-i-Medeniye

Latin alphabets
Cyrillic alphabets
Arabic alphabets
Persian alphabets
Alphabets used by Turkic languages
Crimean Tatar culture